The 1966–67 South-West Indian Ocean cyclone season was an average cyclone season.

Systems

Moderate Tropical Storm Angela
Angela existed from September 29 to October 5.

Moderate Tropical Storm Bella
Bella existed from December 3 to December 5.

Severe Tropical Storm Colette
Colette existed from December 11 to December 22.

Tropical Cyclone Daphne

Daphne existed from December 22 to December 27.

Moderate Tropical Storm Clara-Elisa
Clara-Elisa entered the basin on December 24 and was last noted on January 2.

Moderate Tropical Storm Florence
Florence existed from January 3 to January 7.

Tropical Cyclone Gilberte
Gilberte existed from January 8 to January 18.

Tropical Depression Huguette
Huguette existed from February 7 to February 17.

Tropical Disturbance Irma

Irma existed from February 21 to February 24.

Tropical Cyclone Laura-Jackie 

Laura formed on April 7. It exited the basin on April 12 into the Australian region, where it received the name Jackie.

Tropical Disturbance Kathy

Kathy existed from May 12 to May 21.

See also

 Atlantic hurricane seasons: 1966, 1967
 Eastern Pacific hurricane seasons: 1966, 1967
 Western Pacific typhoon seasons: 1966, 1967
 North Indian Ocean cyclone seasons: 1966, 1967

References

South-West Indian Ocean cyclone seasons